Sobremesa (Spanish: “upon the table”) is the Spanish tradition of relaxing at the table after a heavy meal. It begins after dessert is served, and typically lasts between half an hour and an hour. During summertime and holidays, the practice tends to last longer.

The 'sobremesa hour' is one of Spain's main TV primetimes. In general, physical activity is avoided during this break, and conversation is freely had. Depending on the habits of the area or country in question, coffee, tea, or a small liqueur or aguardiente (in a shot glass) is generally served, or a cigar may be smoked. In countries such as Spain, the after-dinner activity period tends to be enjoyed with the coffee, liqueur, and cigar trilogy.

References 

Pascul, Carlos Gastromy Guide of Spain (First edition), Madrid: Al-Bo1. Pascul, Carlos (1977), Gastrorak, 369 pp.n

Spanish culture